Caliban is a character in William Shakespeare's play The Tempest.

Caliban may also refer to:

Music
 Caliban (band), a metalcore band from Germany
 Caliban's Dream, a track written by Underworld for the Isles of Wonder opening ceremony of the 2012 summer Olympics in London

Fiction
 Caliban (Marvel Comics), a mutant character in the Marvel Comics Universe
 Isaac Asimov's Caliban, the first of a trilogy of science-fiction novels by Roger MacBride Allen
 Caliban (Arduin dungeon), a dungeon module from the Arduin series
 Calibans are native lifeforms in Forty Thousand in Gehenna, a science fiction novel by CJ Cherryh
 Caliban's War, the second book in The Expanse novel series

Other
 Caliban (moon), a moon of Uranus
 Hubert Phillips used this pseudonym